Electricity in Pakistan is generated, transmitted, distributed, and retail supplied by two vertically integrated public sector companies, Water and Power Development Authority (WAPDA) responsible for the production of hydroelectricity and supplied to the consumers by the power distribution companies (DISCOS) under the Pakistan Electric Power Company (PEPCO). Currently, there are 11 distribution companies and one National Transmission And Dispatch Company (NTDC) all in the public sector (except Karachi), and the Karachi Electric (K-Electric) for the city of Karachi and its surrounding areas. There are around 42 independent power producers (IPPs) that contribute significantly in electricity generation in Pakistan.

As of 2016, more than 80% of its population on average has access to electricity.

History 
Pakistan's electricity sector is a developing market. For years, the matter of balancing the country's supply against the demand for electricity had remained a largely unresolved matter. The country faced significant challenges in revamping its network responsible for the supply of electricity. Electricity generators were seeking a parity in returns for both domestic and foreign investors indicating it to be one of the key issues in overseeing a surge in electricity generation when the country was facing growing shortages. Other problems included lack of efficiency, rising demands for energy, and political instability. Provincial and federal agencies, who are the largest consumers, often do not pay their bills. At one point electricity generation had shrunk by up to 50% due to an over-reliance on fossil fuels. The country was hit by its worst power crisis in 2007 when production fell by 6000 Megawatts and massive blackouts followed suit. Load shedding and power blackouts had become severe in Pakistan before 2016.

Mr. Naqeeb and Mr. Mohsin said Economic Survey 2020–21 unfolds that Pakistan's installed capacity to generate electricity has surged up to 37,261 MW by July 2020 which stood at 22,812 MW in June 2013, showing the growth of 64 per cent.

Installed capacity 
According to the Pakistan Economic Survey 2021–22, the installed electricity generation capacity reached 41,557 MW in 2022. The maximum total demand coming from residential and industrial estates stands at nearly 31,000 MW, whereas the transmission and distribution capacity is stalled at approximately 22,000 MW. This leads to a deficit of about 9,000 MW when the demand peaks. This additional 9,000 MW required cannot be transmitted even though the peak demand of the country is well below its installed capacity of 41,557 MW.

The National Transmission and Despatch Company Limited (NTDC) in Pakistan has finished construction on a double-circuit transmission line, which extends for 29 km from Polan to Gwadar. This new infrastructure has been built in compliance with directives from the Prime Minister and the Federal Minister for Energy. The addition of this transmission line will allow for the import of an additional 100 MW of power from Iran, which will result in increased power reliability and decreased frequency of power outages for the residents of Gwadar and the Makran division.

Electricity concerns 
Power outages are common in all cities and villages of Pakistan. Situation is worse in rural and remote areas. At some places there is no electricity for upto 18 hours a day. Many rural or remote areas are still not electrified due to lack of transmission lines.
Electricity demand in Pakistan has reached all time high due to the ever increasing population.

Major blackouts also regularly happen in Pakistan due to engineering faults or blasts in transformers. These blackouts can effect huge areas and remain for many days till the issue is resolved. Electricity distribution infrastructure is also outdated and of substandard quality throughout the country. Hence, Pakistan is still facing electricity concerns, power outages and loadshedding. Government is trying to increase the electricity generation, upgrade the electricity distribution infrastructure, reduce transmission losses, eradicate power outages and make electricity cheaper in the future.

Electricity generation 
 Electricity – total installed capacity (FY2021–22): 41,557MW
 Electricity – installed capacity by source (FY2021–22):
 Natural gas: 32.3% of total
 Hydroelectric: 24.7% of total
 Furnace oil: 14.3% of total
 Coal: 12.8% of total
 Nuclear: 8.8% of total
 Wind: 4.8% of total
 Solar:1.4% of total
 Bagasse: 0.9% of total

Electricity consumption 
 Electricity – total consumption: 89,361 GWh (2021–2022)
 Electricity – consumption by sector (2021–2022):
 Household – 47%
 Commercial – 7%
 Industrial – 28%
 Agricultural – 9%
 Others – 8%

Governance and sector reform 
Recent reforms include the unbundling and corporatisation of the Water and Power Development Authority (WAPDA) into 10 regional distribution companies, 4 government-owned thermal power generation companies and a transmission company, the National Transmission and Despatch Company. The hydropower plants were retained by WAPDA as WAPDA Hydroelectric. All are fully owned by the government. K-Electric Limited (formally known as Karachi Electric Supply Company), which is responsible for power generation and distribution in the Karachi area, is listed on the stock exchanges and is privately owned. Privately owned independent power producers generated 53% of the country's power in FY2016.

In 2019, Alternative and Renewable Energy policy was introduced to promote renewable energy in the country and reduce carbon footprint and greenhouse gas emissions. The policy aims to increase share of green energy to 20% by 2025 and 30% by 2030. As of 2022, only 3% of energy sources in Pakistan are renewables.

Effects of natural and man-made disasters 
During 2010 Pakistan floods and 2005 Kashmir earthquake power stations, power distribution and transmission and other energy infrastructures were damaged. During the floods and rainfalls the recently constructed Jinnah hydroelectric power plant was flooded in addition to severe damages to transmission and distribution network and installations while several power plants and refineries were threatened by rising waters and had to be shut down. Natural gas field output had to be reduced as the flood waters approached the wells. There has also been some concern by Pakistani nuclear activists over the effect of natural disasters on nuclear plants specially over the Chashma Nuclear Power Plant, since the plant lies over a geological fault. Due to over reliance of Pakistan on dams for electricity generation, some environmental impacts of dams such as submergence of usable/ecological land and their negative impact on Pakistan's mangrove forests due to loss of river silt load, as well as increased risk of severe floods have become evident.

See also 
 List of power stations in Pakistan
 List of electricity distribution companies of Pakistan
 Water & Power Development Authority
 Economy of Pakistan
 Pakistan Electric Power Company
 Alternative Energy Development Board
 National Electric Power Regulatory Authority
 Karachi Electric Supply Company
 Pakistan national energy policy

References

Further reading 
 Robert M. Hathaway, editor, and Michael Kugelman, editor, Powering Pakistan, Oxford University Press, USA (15 January 2010), hardcover, 216 pages